Ander Egiluz Alzola (born April 27, 1998) is a professional soccer player who plays as a defensive midfielder and center back for USL Championship club El Paso Locomotive. Born in Spain, he has represented the United States at youth level.

Club career
Egiluz joined the Athletic Bilbao academy in 2016, where he played through to the team's under-19 squad, before signing with Tercera División club CD Basconia in 2017. While with Basconia, Egiluz went on loan to SD Leioa in Spain's third division, Segunda División B, where he ultimately signed full time in 2019. After Leioa, Egiluz spent a short period with CP Villarrobledo where he made eight appearances before transferring to Haro Deportivo, playing in 13 matches.

On February 15, 2022, Egiluz moved to the United States, signing with USL Championship side El Paso Locomotive.

International
Although born in the Basque Country in Spain, Egiluz chose to represent the United States at international level, for which he was eligible due to his mother being born in the state of Idaho. Egiluz made two appearances in the 2016 Slovakia Cup, which the team went on to win.

References

External links
 
 

1998 births
Living people
Footballers from Getxo
American soccer players
Spanish footballers
Association football defenders
Segunda División B players
Tercera División players
CD Basconia footballers
SD Leioa players
CP Villarrobledo players
Haro Deportivo players
El Paso Locomotive FC players
Spanish expatriate footballers
Expatriate soccer players in the United States
Spanish expatriate sportspeople in the United States
USL Championship players
United States men's youth international soccer players